Zohorna is a surname. Notable people with the surname include:

 Hynek Zohorna (born 1990), Czech ice hockey player
 Radim Zohorna (born 1996), Czech ice hockey player
 Tomáš Zohorna (born 1988), Czech ice hockey player, brother of Hynek and Radim

Czech-language surnames